Admiral Townsend may refer to:

George Townshend (Royal Navy officer) (1716–1769), British Royal Navy admiral
Isaac Townsend (c. 1685–1765), British Royal Navy admiral
John Townshend, 4th Marquess Townshend (1798–1863), British Royal Navy rear admiral
Julius Curtis Townsend (1881–1939), U.S. Navy rear admiral
Leslie Townsend (Royal Navy officer) (1924–1999), British Royal Navy rear admiral